The Awatere River is a river in the Gisborne region of the North island of New Zealand. The Awatere is formed by the confluence of the Kopuapounamu River and the Taurangakautuku River and enters the Pacific Ocean just east of Te Araroa.

The New Zealand Ministry for Culture and Heritage gives a translation of "swift river" for Awatere.

State Highway 35 runs down the valley of the Awatere for much of the river's length.

References

External links
 entry at LINZ topographic names database
 New Zealand 1:50,000 topographic map BD45 - Te Araroa

Rivers of the Gisborne District
Rivers of New Zealand